This is a list of ships of the Polish Navy from the outbreak of World War II to the present day.

Currently in service

Submarines (1)

Frigates (2)

Corvettes (2)

Fast Attack Craft Missile (3)

Minehunters/minesweepers (21)

Minelayer-landing ships (5)

Salvage ships (4)

Auxiliaries (6)

Training ships (2)

Other
Over 40 other ships and yachts including museum ship  (H34).

Border Guard ships

Warsaw Pact

Destroyers 
 
  (56)
 
  (271)
 
  (273)
  (274)

Corvettes 
 Tarantul I-class corvette
  (434)
  (435)
  (436)
  (437)

Submarines 
 
  (292)
  (293)
 
  (292) 
  (293) 
  (295) 
  (294)
 M-XV-class submarine

Fast Attack Craft Missile 
 
 ORP Hel (421)
 ORP Gdańsk (422)
 ORP Gdynia (423)
 ORP Kołobrzeg (424)
 ORP Szczecin (425)
 ORP Elbląg (426)
 ORP Puck (427)
 ORP Ustka (428)
 ORP Oksywie (429)
 ORP Darłowo (430)
  (431)
 ORP Dziwnów (432)
  (433)

Torpedo boats
 Project 663D torpedo boat 
 ORP Błyskawiczny
Project 664 class torpedo boat
 ORP Bitny (KTD-452)
 ORP Bystry (KTD-453)
 ORP Dzielny (KTD-454)
 ORP Dziarski (KTD-455) 
 ORP Sprawny (KTD-456) 
 ORP Szybki (KTD-457)
 ORP Odważny (KTD-458)
 ORP Odporny (KTD-459)

Training ships 
Hansa A type
 , later renamed Gryf
Schooner
 ORP Iskra (1917)

World War II

Polish navy before World War II

Ships built and used before the war
 Gryf class

Planned and in construction
Improved Grom-class destroyer
 ORP Huragan
 ORP Orkan
 ORP Miecznik

Polish Navy in the West (acting in cooperation with the Allies)

Ships that retreated to Great Britain

Ships loaned to PMW (Polish Navy) during the war
 
 
 
 G-class destroyer
 
 M-class destroyer
 
 N-class destroyer
 
 
 
 
 
 
 Okręt Francuski Ouragan
 S-class submarine
 
 U-class submarine

References

 
Poland
Ships of the Polish Navy
Polish Navy
Poland